The Dawson-Lambton Glacier is a heavily crevassed glacier entering the south-eastern Weddell Sea immediately west of the Brunt Ice Shelf. It was discovered in January 1915 by a British expedition led by Ernest Shackleton. He named it for Elizabeth Dawson-Lambton, a benefactress of the Shackleton expeditions.

Important Bird Area
A 500 ha site on fast ice that forms in the Weddell Sea near the Dawson-Lambton Glacier has been designated an Important Bird Area (IBA) by BirdLife International because it supports a breeding colony of emperor penguins, with an estimate of some 2,600 individuals based on 2009 satellite imagery.

See also
 List of glaciers in the Antarctic
 Dawson-Lambton Trough
 Glaciology

References

External links
 

Important Bird Areas of Antarctica
Penguin colonies
Glaciers of Coats Land